Aristid Georgiyevich Panaiotidi (born 28 February 1971) is a former Russian football player.

Panaiotidi played in the Russian Top League with FC Dynamo-Gazovik Tyumen.

He worked as a technical director for FC Dynamo Moscow in the late 2000s.

References

1971 births
Footballers from Moscow
Russian people of Greek descent
Living people
Pontic Greeks
Soviet people of Greek descent
Soviet footballers
Russian footballers
FC Tyumen players
Russian Premier League players
FC Mika players
Russian expatriate footballers
Expatriate footballers in Armenia
FC Kristall Smolensk players
Association football goalkeepers
FC Iskra Smolensk players
FC Spartak Ryazan players
FC Spartak-2 Moscow players